Tetragonoderus spinifer is a species of beetle in the family Carabidae. It was described by Jeannel in 1949.

References

Beetles described in 1949
spinifer